Sarchí Sur is a district of the Sarchí canton, in the Alajuela province of Costa Rica.

Geography 
Sarchí Sur has an area of  km² and an elevation of  metres.

Demographics 

For the 2011 census, Sarchí Sur had a population of  inhabitants.

Transportation

Road transportation 
The district is covered by the following road routes:
 National Route 118
 National Route 708

Places of Interest 
 Plaza de la Artesanía: a large modern mall of souvenir shops where numerous buses carrying tourists from San José and elsewhere arrive throughout the day.
 Fabrica de carretas joaquin chaverri: a medium shop where you can find all kinds of souvenirs and painted oxcart.

References 

Districts of Alajuela Province
Populated places in Alajuela Province